Hungry Hall was the name of two unrelated Canadian trading posts.

1. Saskatchewan River (NWC,1791): In 1790 William Thorburn of the North West Company built a post on the right bank of the Saskatchewan River near Nipawin, Saskatchewan to cut off the Hudson's Bay Company trade at Cumberland House, Saskatchewan.  Next year, he moved downriver and built a post on the left bank of the river opposite Petaigan Creek.  It was called Hungry Hall because of its poor returns. Malcomb Ross was sent up from Cumberland House to build a competing post beside him. It seems to have been closed in 1794. Today the site is probably under Tobin Lake. A version of Thorburn's name was given to Tobin Rapid. The name may have been transferred to the Lake.

2. Rainy River (HBC,1825): In 1825, the Hudson's Bay Company built Hungry Hall on the Rainy River close to the former Asp House. In 1834 it was abandoned by agreement with the American Fur Company. In 1863 it reappears in the records as an outpost. It was closed in 1893 due to American competition. The site is at the current Oak Grove Resort where a historical marker has been installed on the riverbank. Its name was borrowed by a band of the Rainy River First Nations.

References

 Manitoba archives /search /HBCA online:-search Asp Hall 

North West Company forts
Hudson's Bay Company trading posts